The 2020 Indianapolis 500 (branded as the 104th Running of the Indianapolis 500 presented by Gainbridge for sponsorship reasons) was a 500-mile (800 km, 200 lap) automobile race held on Sunday, August 23, 2020, at the Indianapolis Motor Speedway in Speedway, Indiana. It was the premier event of the 2020 IndyCar Series. Takuma Sato won the race for Rahal Letterman Lanigan Racing, his second Indianapolis 500 win, having previously won the 2017 race. It was also the second Indy 500 victory for car owners Bobby Rahal and David Letterman (2004, 2020). Rahal also won himself as a driver in 1986. It was also Honda's first Indy 500 win in the Reiwa era.

Five-time IndyCar Series champion, and 2008 race winner Scott Dixon started in the middle of the front row, and dominated much of the race. Dixon led 111 laps, and led by as many as 7 seconds at one point during the first half. After the final round of pit stops, however, Sato chased down and passed Dixon for position on lap 172, which proved to be the winning move. After all other cars had cycled through their final pit stops, Sato elevated to the lead on lap 186. He was leading the race on lap 195 when a caution came out for a heavy crash by Spencer Pigot at the pit lane attenuator. With insufficient time to red flag the race for the cleanup, the final four laps were run under caution with Sato taking the checkered flag.

Originally scheduled for May 24, the race was postponed to August 23 due to the COVID-19 pandemic. The 2020 running was the first time the race was not held on or around Memorial Day in late May. On August 4, it was announced that the race would be held without spectators.

Practice was held on August 12–14 and time trials was held on August 15–16. Carb Day, the traditional final day of practice, was scheduled for August 21. A somewhat truncated schedule was utilized, with numerous ancillary events (Freedom 100, Pit Stop Challenge, concerts, and various festivities) cancelled. Marco Andretti, son of Michael Andretti and grandson of 1969 Indianapolis 500 winner Mario Andretti, won the pole position for Andretti Autosport. The achievement came 33 years after Mario won his third pole in 1987, and was the first Indy pole for the Andretti Autosport team since 2005.  Andretti ended up finishing 13th, while the previous year's winner Simon Pagenaud of Team Penske finished 22nd.

Race background

Sponsorship
On January 31, 2019, it was announced that the online financial services company Gainbridge would become the new presenting sponsor of the 500 under a four-year deal. This was the second year under the current deal.

Safety changes
On May 24, 2019, it was announced that IndyCar Series would introduce cockpit protection combining an aeroscreen and Halo from 2020 season onward. The cockpit protection was built by Red Bull Advanced Technologies. The combination of aeroscreen and halo is designed to improve safety standards by deflecting debris away from a driver's head and was originally developed for use in Formula One and IndyCar before its application was expanded to other open-wheel championships. During the first two races of the season, drivers experienced stifling heat in the cockpits, caused by the now limited airflow. A supplemental air duct was added to the aeroscreen beginning at Iowa to help cool the cockpits.

On July 17, 2020, the aeroscreen had its first major test at Iowa Speedway during the 2020 Iowa IndyCar 250s when during an aborted restart on lap 157, Ed Carpenter Racing's Rinus VeeKay appeared to slow behind eventual race winner Simon Pagenaud and move to the right, and behind the Dutch rookie, Andretti Harding Steinbrenner Racing's Colton Herta was caught in an accordion affect, launching the No. 88 Honda over the left-rear tire of VeeKay's No. 21 Chevy. Prior to getting significantly airborne, Herta's unimpeded nose – minus its wings – attempted to spear into the left side of VeeKay's cockpit, level with his helmet. With the aeroscreen acting as a vertical barrier, Herta's nose was forced upward, sliding skyward on the screen before hitting the top of the aeroscreen frame and flying over VeeKay's Dallara DW12 chassis. This saved VeeKay from apparent serious injury.

Ownership changes
On November 3, 2019, it was announced that Penske Entertainment Corp., a subsidiary of the Penske Corporation, owned by Roger Penske, had purchased the Indianapolis Motor Speedway, the IndyCar Series, and IMS Productions. Penske, owner of Team Penske stepped down as full-time-race strategist and focus on the new ownership roles. The sale was finalized in January 2020.

Shortly after acquiring the property, Penske swiftly began upgrading and beautifying several areas at the track, particularly in the spectator areas. A refurbishment of the restrooms and concession stands, as well as widening and re-paving/paving walkways behind the grandstands along with new fencing was completed in the spring. Thirty new video boards were installed along the mainstretch grandstands, along with a new  video screen on the back of the Pagoda in the Pagoda Plaza. Other improvements included power washing, painting, improved internet service, general repairs, landscaping, hardscaping, and new lighting at the main gate. The victory lane podium was refurbished to include a new platform hoist to lift the winning car to the top.

Qualifying changes
The Last Row Shootout was expanded to a 75-minute session in order to allow multiple qualifying attempts for each participant. In the previous year participants in the shootout were permitted only one attempt. However, only 33 cars entered the 2020 event meaning there would be no last row shootout in 2020.
For practice on Fast Friday (August 14) and during time trials (August 15–16), turbocharger boost settings were increased to allow an additional . Engines were permitted 150 kPa of turbocharger "boost".

Rule changes
Teams were permitted seven crew members over-the-wall servicing the car during pit stops. This is up from six utilized from 1988 to 2019. The sole purpose of the seventh member is to clean or remove tear-offs from the new aeroscreen. Teams were allowed four tire changers, one fueler, one pneumatic jack operator, and one aeroscreen attendant. The aeroscreen attendant is not permitted to service any other part of the car. After cockpit cooling issues during the first two races of the season, the aeroscreen attendant was also given the permission to provide the driver with a drink bottle.
Grid penalties for unapproved engine changes have been reinstated for the 2020 season. However, no penalties were served at the Indianapolis 500. Penalties from the previous race, or penalties incurred at the 500 were enforced at Gateway.
Any unapproved work performed on a car during red flag conditions will result in immediate disqualification (Rule 7.1.4.2.4). Previously, cars were only assessed a two-lap penalty for unapproved work during red flags.

Schedule
On March 12, 2020, the Speedway announced that the threat of the COVID-19 pandemic had not yet caused any changes to the proposed schedule. One day later on March 13, IndyCar officials announced that the first four races of the 2020 IndyCar season would be cancelled, along with the open test at Indianapolis scheduled for April 30.
On March 26, the series announced the rescheduling of the 2020 Indianapolis 500 to August 23. The GMR Grand Prix was rescheduled for and held July 4, as part of the NASCAR Brickyard 400 weekend, and a matinee doubleheader with the Xfinity Series Pennzoil 150. On May 31, it was announced that the 2020 Indy Lights season had been cancelled, and therefore the Freedom 100, traditionally run on Carb Day, would not be held.

The first two IndyCar events (Texas and GMR Grand Prix) were held mostly behind closed doors. Roger Penske stated on June 8 that "we are going to run it [Indianapolis 500] with fans", and that the race could be delayed further if they are unable to admit spectators. On June 26, it was initially announced that spectators would be admitted for the Indianapolis 500 at half capacity, including restricting grandstands, and not holding the Snake Pit concert party.

On July 20, Penske Entertainment CEO Mark Miles stated that the IndyCar Series was continuing to work with local health officials, and that "unless the COVID-19 world crashes in on us and healthcare metrics really turn south meaningfully, I'm quite confident we'll be able to do the race." On July 21, the Speedway announced the attendance cap for the race would be reduced to a quarter of its total capacity, and that attendees would be required to wear face coverings. On August 4, citing COVID-19 case trends in Marion County (which contains Indianapolis and IMS), it was announced that the race would be held without spectators.

On August 7, the Last Row Shootout, previously scheduled to take place directly before the Fast Nine Shootout on August 16, was cancelled since the final entry list did not contain more than 33 entries.

Source: 2020 Indianapolis 500 Event Schedule

Festivities
On March 18, it was announced that the 500 Festival Mini-Marathon scheduled for May 2 would not be held. On July 22, Legends Day and the 500 Festival Parade downtown were cancelled. The annual Last Row Party was cancelled, as well as the annual Old Timers Banquet and Hall of Fame induction ceremony. The 2020 Hall of Fame class (Janet Guthrie and Dale Earnhardt Sr.) will be inducted alongside the 2021 class.

On August 4, it was announced that the Pit Stop Challenge, traditionally held on Carb Day, would be cancelled. On August 7, the traditional balloon release was removed from the pre-race festivities.

Dr. Elvis Francois and Dr. William Robinson, known as the "Singing Surgeons", will perform "The Star-Spangled Banner". Francois and Robinson previously performed "God Bless America" during the NBC Special "Back Home Again" on May 24. Jim Cornelison returned for his fourth year to perform "Back Home Again in Indiana"

Start time
Citing summer heat, the Speedway announced the start time would be moved back one hour and forty-five minutes from 12:45 p.m. to 2:30 p.m. (EDT), the latest scheduled start time of the Indianapolis 500. For many years after World War II, the race had traditionally been scheduled to start at 11 a.m. local time, which was typically equivalent to 12 p.m. EDT. After exceptions in 1970 (12 p.m. local time), and from 2005 to 2010 (1 p.m.), the race went back to a 12 p.m. EDT (approximate) start time since 2011, but switched to 12:45 p.m. in 2019 under NBC's television contract.

With the final round coverage of The Open Championship at Royal Troon, a women's golf major (the men's had been cancelled that year), scheduled for August 23 to air on NBC, the later start time allows The Open to finish without interfering with television coverage of the Indy 500.

On July 8, NASCAR announced the remainder of its schedule through the end of August, which included a 200-mile Xfinity Series and 500-kilometer Cup Series doubleheader at Dover the same day as the Indy 500. The races were  part of a twin race weekend for both series where both series raced the respective distances (the Saturday races are the May races postponed by the pandemic;  the Cup Series races were trimmed by 89 laps and became 500-kilometer races). The races aired in part against the Indy 500 on NBCSN.

Original schedule
The original schedule for the 2020 Indianapolis 500 was released in early 2020.

Entry list
The official entry list was published by IndyCar on August 10 with a total of 33 car/driver combinations. All entries used the Dallara IR12 chassis, with Firestone tires. A total of eight former Indy 500 winners were included. It was the most former winners in the field since there were ten in 1992.

Three-time Indy 500 winner Hélio Castroneves (2001, 2002, 2009) made his 20th consecutive start. He became the 9th driver all-time to achieve 20 career starts. He moved into a tie for third all-time for most consecutive starts.

As the defending Indy Lights champion, Oliver Askew was guaranteed an entry as part of the Road to Indy scholarship program. He signed with Arrow McLaren SP. Two-time Formula One World Champion Fernando Alonso confirmed that he was returning for his third Indianapolis 500 attempt, in a third Arrow McLaren SP entry.

Byrd Racing announced they would not field a dedicated entry due to financial issues, but later announced a deal that "had come together quickly" with Dale Coyne Racing, Indy Lights team Belardi Auto Racing and NASCAR and sports car team Rick Ware Racing to field a car for James Davison.

DragonSpeed became the 33rd entry for the race after finding the necessary funding the weekend before opening practice.

For the first time since 1999, there was not a female driver in the starting lineup. The 2020 race also marked the first time since 1991 that not a single female driver was entered.

 Former Indianapolis 500 Winner
 Indianapolis 500 Rookie

Testing and Rookie Orientation

Aeroscreen test – October 2019
The series conducted an official evaluation test on October 2, 2019, at the Indianapolis Motor Speedway. Two teams tested the new aeroscreen developed by Red Bull Advanced Technologies. The cockpit safety device is scheduled to be implemented for the 2020 season. Scott Dixon and Will Power collectively drove more than  worth of laps, and the test yielded mostly positive results.

Oval rookie test — February 14
Four IndyCar rookies took part in an oval acclimation test at Texas Motor Speedway on February 14. Oliver Askew, Álex Palou, Rinus VeeKay, and Scott McLaughlin took part in the test, which was conducted by IndyCar officials. The test provided the drivers with high-speed oval experience prior to the start of the Rookie Orientation Program. Veterans Josef Newgarden and Ed Carpenter also took laps, doing further evaluations of the new aeroscreens. Cold temperatures delayed the start of the test, but a total of five hours of track time was available. No incidents were reported.

Open test
A full field open test was scheduled for Thursday, April 30. However, the test was cancelled due to the COVID-19 pandemic. When the Indianapolis 500 was later rescheduled for August 23, no testing time (open test or private testing) was made available before practice was to begins on August 12. The original date of the race would have made it the first oval track event of the 2020 season. With the rescheduled date, the race will now be the fourth of six oval races, as well as the second superspeedway race, Texas being the first. This is the first time since 2010 (Kansas) that there will be a superspeedway race held prior to the Indianapolis 500.

During the week leading up to the originally scheduled race day, Simon Pagenaud and Alexander Rossi took some demonstration laps for the NBC Sports special "Back Home Again" which aired on May 24. It marked the first laps both drivers had taken with the new aeroscreens; however, none of the laps were driven at racing speed.

Rookie Orientation / Refresher tests — Wednesday, August 12
Weather: , Partly cloudy
Summary: A dedicated session for Rookie Orientation and veteran Refresher tests was held from 1 p.m. to 3 p.m. A total of five rookies took part, along with seven veterans including Helio Castroneves and Fernando Alonso. The rookie test consisted of three phases. The refresher test consisted of phases 2 and 3 only. Four of the five rookies passed all three phases during the session: Oliver Askew, Patricio O'Ward, Álex Palou, and Rinus VeeKay. Dalton Kellett passed two phases, then completed the third phase later in the day. All seven veteran drivers who participated in the session passed their refresher tests. Race veteran Ben Hanley, who did not take to the track Wednesday, will be required to pass the refresher test on Thursday. Rinus VeeKay was the fastest rookie of the session, while Helio Castroneves was the fastest veteran of the session. No incidents were reported.

Practice

Opening day Practice — Wednesday, August 12

Weather: , mostly cloudy
Summary: 1963 Indianapolis 500 winner Parnelli Jones celebrated his 87th birthday by waving the ceremonial green flag from his home in Rolling Hills, California. A total of 32 drivers took practice laps over three sessions. The first session from 11 a.m. to 1 p.m. was reserved for veteran drivers active in the 2020 IndyCar season. After a break for the Rookie Orientation/Refresher session, general practice resumed from 3 p.m. to 5:30 p.m. No incidents were reported, except for Charlie Kimball who barely white-walled the outside wall at the entrance of turn two. Marco Andretti brought out an early yellow for a tow-in after stalling in turn four, but he was able to return to the track shortly after. The only car that did not take laps during the scheduled sessions was Ben Hanley. After the close of practice, officials provided Hanley with about 35 minutes of solo track time to work on his refresher test.

Practice — Thursday, August 13

Weather: , mostly cloudy
Summary: The second day of practice saw the first major incident of the week. At 4:40 p.m., Fernando Alonso came through turn four, but dipped too low and the left side wheels made contact with the concrete curbing below the white line. Alonso lost control and smacked the outside wall exiting turn four, then spun to a stop at the north end of the pit lane. Alonso climbed out uninjured, and the car suffered moderate damage. Takuma Sato (225.693 mph) set a fast lap early in the day, and it held up until the final fifteen minutes. Late in the session, Scott Dixon took over the top speed for the day with a lap of 226.102 mph in fairly hot conditions. The fastest "no-tow" lap of the day belonged to Jack Harvey at 222.123 mph. For the second day in a row, teams were working actively on various downforce settings, acclimating to the unfamiliar hot August conditions. Some teams were also working out various issues and complications with the new cockpit cooling hoses. A total of 32 cars took practice laps, with Ben Hanley again not able to practice as he had not completed his mandatory Refresher test. Hanley did pass one phase of the Refresher test during a solo session after the conclusion of practice.

Fast Friday Practice — Friday, August 14

Weather: , partly cloudy
Andretti's teammate Ryan Hunter-Reay was also near the top of the speed chart, turning in the fastest "no-tow" lap. Andretti set the fast time early in the day, before the hot and sunny conditions of the afternoon. Honda-powered machines took nine of the top ten spots, with Conor Daly the only Chevrolet in the top ten. Daly was the fastest Chevy of the day; however, his speed was achieved with a tow. Most teams spent the day doing qualifying simulations. In order to avoid placing their cars in a tow, most teams actively avoided going out while others cars were on the track, or at least made certain there was adequate spacing between cars (≈10 second or more). Scott Dixon was 45 minutes late getting onto the track after his car stalled multiple times with electrical issues. The team was able to make corrections and he posted the third-best lap of the day. All 33 cars took laps at speed, and no incidents were reported. After the conclusion of practice, the traditional qualifying draw was held. Graham Rahal selected the coveted first spot in the qualifying line with his teammate Takuma Sato second.

Time trials

First day — Saturday, August 15
Weather: , partly cloudy.
Summary: Time trials on Saturday determined the nine drivers moving on to the Fast Nine Shootout on Sunday and the final starting positions for spots 10–33. The day was dominated by Andretti Autosport, who claimed the top four positions. He reverted to his four-lap average set earlier in the day. Chevrolet-powered cars struggled during the session with only one Chevy driver, Indianapolis 500 rookie Rinus VeeKay, qualifying for the Fast Nine Shootout. Only five Chevrolets ranked in the top twenty positions. Álex Palou, another Indianapolis 500 rookie, also advanced to the Fast Nine Shootout by qualifying in seventh place. Defending winners Team Penske were unexpectedly lacking speed, with three of the team's four cars falling outside the top 20. Fernando Alonso also struggled to find pace as he managed only twenty-sixth place. No incidents occurred during the day.

Fast Nine Shootout — Sunday, August 16

Summary: The Fast Nine Shootout began at 1:15 p.m. eastern. Gusty winds made conditions more challenging for the drivers than the previous day, resulting in reduced speeds. Andretti beat Dixon over the four-lap run by 0.0113 seconds, the third-closest margin between first and second in qualifying in the race's history. It also marked the first time since 1987 that a member of the Andretti family qualified for the pole position, when Marco's grandfather Mario performed the same feat. Takuma Sato (who ranked 9th on Saturday) was the first driver to make an attempt, and set the early pace with a  average. His speed held up enough to qualify third and sit on the outside of the front row. Rinus VeeKay qualified fourth, making him both the highest qualified rookie and highest Chevrolet driver in the field. Álex Palou turned the fastest single lap of the session, but suffered large speed drop offs over subsequent laps due to a broken weightjacker, relegating him to 7th. Alexander Rossi suffered the biggest drop from Saturday to Sunday, dropping six positions. Rossi reportedly suffered handling problems as the run progressed, and dropped to 9th. The front row of Andretti, Dixon, and Sato marked the first sweep of the front row for Honda since 2011 – a year in which Honda was the sole engine manufacturer.

Post-qualifying practice

Sunday, August 16

Summary: A three-hour practice session began at 3:30 p.m. after the conclusion of the Fast Nine Shootout. Teams reverted the cars to race turbocharger boost settings and spent the session running in traffic to simulate race day conditions. At 4:11 p.m., Scott Dixon lost control of his car in turn four, making light contact with the outside wall before skidding across the track and making further contact with the pit wall. However, the car was repaired before the end of session, and Dixon returned to the track to set the third-fastest time of the session. Fernando Alonso suffered a minor incident when he spun leaving his pit box late in the session, but his car was undamaged.

Carb Day — Friday, August 21

Weather: , sunny, fair
Summary: The traditional Carb Day final practice was held Friday, with the track available for two hours, up from one hour in the past several years. Race rookie Patricio O'Ward set the fastest lap of the day. Polesitter Marco Andretti ranked only 28th in the session. No major incidents were reported, although Sage Karam lightly brushed the wall in turn four. All 33 qualified cars took to the track, with Marcus Ericsson leading the pack with 105 laps. Due to the COVID-19 pandemic, the traditional Pit Stop Challenge was not held, and the Carb Day concert was cancelled as well.

Starting grid

Race summary

First half

The race began with Scott Dixon immediately pulling into the lead, with pole sitter Marco Andretti being shuffled to third by the end of the lap. Further back in the field, Ed Carpenter impacted the wall in the south short chute, requiring Carpenter to repair damage to the suspension. Carpenter alleged he was forced into the wall by Zach Veach, but IndyCar officials took no action. The first caution of the day came only 6 laps into the race, when James Davison suffered a brake issue that caused the entire right front wheel assembly to catch fire and spray debris along the backstretch. Davison brought the flaming car to a halt just before pit entrance and exited the car safely. Davison later indicated that the brake master cylinder locked on the car, causing the brakes to be stuck on and generate large amounts of heat, ultimately leading to the magnesium wheels catching fire. Racing resumed at lap 12, with Dixon and Takuma Sato, while Ryan Hunter-Reay, James Hinchcliffe, and Alexander Rossi completed the top 5. The second caution of the race came only a short time later at lap 25, when Marcus Ericsson lost control of his car in turn one and crashed into the outside wall then slid until part way through turn 2. Ericsson was uninjured, but was out of the race. During the caution, nearly all of the front running cars pitted, with Dixon, Sato, and Andretti emerging first. Cars that had pitted during the first caution cycled to the front of the field, meaning that rookie Oliver Askew now led the race ahead of defending winner Simon Pagenaud and 2018 winner Will Power.

Racing resumed again at lap 31, with Pagenaud taking the lead from Askew entering turn 1. Behind, those that pitted began to work their way up through the field, with Dixon moving up to 6th and Alexander Rossi moving up several spots to 7th. At lap 46, those who had stayed out at the previous caution began to pit, and Dixon reclaimed the lead with Rossi second. Pit stops on the majority strategy began at roughly lap 60, with Dixon retaining his lead. Rossi lost several seconds after a late call to pit lane resulted in him missing pit lane altogether and being forced to take another lap. Rinus VeeKay, who had been running in the top 5, slid through his pit stall and hit one of his crew members, resulting in a stop and hold penalty. Sage Karam also suffered issues after coming into the pits too fast and sliding completely past his pit box.

By lap 75, Dixon had pulled a gap of over 7 seconds to Askew who ran second and over 10 seconds to Rossi in third. However, the lead was erased by the race's third caution at lap 84, when Dalton Kellett slid wide into the outside wall in turn 3 after a failed attempt to pass Ben Hanley. Most of the field pitted during this sequence, though the off-strategy runners came in later and emerged at the end of the field. Following stops, the running order ran Dixon, Sato, Rossi, Patricio O'Ward, and Josef Newgarden. The restart from the third caution came at lap 91, but another incident occurred before the cars reached the start/finish line. Conor Daly lost control of his car in turn 4 and spun in front of traffic. Behind him, Oliver Askew spun in avoidance and crashed heavily into the inside wall before ricocheting back towards the track and impacting Daly's car. Askew suffered a concussion from the impact, but was released from the infield care center with no symptoms or diagnosis, initially thought to have just been winded. Askew would later be forced to miss the Harvest Grand Prix later in the year after complaining of balance and coordination issues and being declared medically unfit by IndyCar's medical team.

Second half
Racing resumed at lap 100 with Alexander Rossi moving past Takuma Sato to take second place behind Scott Dixon. Dixon and Rossi began exchanging the lead back and forth in an effort to keep momentum up and break away from Sato and Patricio O'Ward behind them, but were only marginally successful in doing so. At lap 121, the fifth caution of the day interrupted their battle, as Álex Palou lost control of his car in turn 1 and crashed into the outside wall before spinning and skidding to a stop at the entrance of turn 2. During the caution most of the field pitted, with Dixon emerging ahead again. Behind, Rossi was released into the path of Sato, leading to minor contact and Sato having to take evasive action to avoid crashing heavily into Rossi's car. Rossi was assessed a penalty for an unsafe release and was moved to the end of the field for the following restart. Felix Rosenqvist inherited the lead by being the only driver not to pit, while Dixon, O'Ward, Sato, and Graham Rahal sat behind him.

Green flag conditions returned at lap 130. Rosenqvist lead for a few laps before teammate Dixon passed him at lap 132. Behind him, Sato and Rahal both moved past O'Ward, giving them second and third positions once Rosenqvist finally pitted. At lap 144, the sixth caution of the day came, this time for Rossi, who lost control of his car in turn 2 and impacted the outside wall. Racing resumed at lap 154 with Dixon still ahead of Sato. On lap 157, Sato passed Dixon to take the lead for the first time of the race, just before final pit stops.

Finish
The final round of pit stops came around lap 168. After the pit stops Dixon emerged ahead of Sato once again, with Rahal running in third. Zach Veach and Max Chilton remained on track in front of them for several laps hoping for a caution to extend their fuel, but eventually peeled off and pitted. On lap 172, Sato passed Dixon again, effectively making him the leader. This became the actual lead at lap 186 after Veach's pit stop. With 19 laps to go, Sato came under increasing pressure from Dixon after Dixon's team indicated that fuel millage concerns were no longer an issue. Despite several attempts, Dixon was unable to get around Sato before they reached lap traffic, which allowed Sato to gap Dixon. On lap 195, the seventh and final caution of the race came when Spencer Pigot lost control exiting turn 4, spun, and made heavy contact with the pit lane attenuator, causing severe damage to both the car and the wall separating pit lane from the front straightaway. A team of safety workers and medical staff extracted Pigot from the heavily damaged vehicle and laid him down on his back on front straightway during the closing laps for a cursory medical examination before ordering him ambulanced to Indiana University Health Methodist Hospital. He was discharged a few hours later with no major injury. Significant damage to the pit wall, however, forced the race to end under caution, with Takuma Sato taking his second victory ahead of Scott Dixon and Graham Rahal. Santino Ferrucci and Josef Newgarden progressed from deep on the starting grid to round out the top 5 positions. Patricio O'Ward finished in sixth position, securing Rookie of the Year honors in the process.

Box score

Notes

 Race ended under caution.

 Points include qualification points from time trials, 1 point for leading a lap, and 2 points for most laps led.

 All 33 qualifiers utilized a Dallara chassis and Firestone tires.

Broadcasting

Television
The race was televised on NBC in the United States; also, for the first time since 2016, the race was not blacked out in the Indianapolis area, airing live on WTHR (channel 13), as ticket sales ended four weeks prior to the race, and under regulations of the Speedway and Marion County Public Health Department's orders regarding capacity limits for events, announced two weeks before tickets were revoked under Marion County orders. On the original date of the race, NBC aired an encore of the 2019 edition of the race, Back Home Again, with Mike Tirico joined by Simon Pagenaud and Alexander Rossi (645,000 viewers)

On August 23, the live coverage on NBC was scheduled to begin at 1 p.m. eastern, following live coverage of The AIG Open Championship. The start of the race was moved from 12:45 p.m. to 2:30 p.m. During coverage of practice, time trials, and race day, driver analyst Paul Tracy moved out of the Pagoda and reported from the Turn Two Suites. This mimicked the position Bobby Unser utilized from 1993 to 1997. Tracy's position offered unique perspective, as well as promoted social distancing among the reporters.

Absent from the crew was Dale Earnhardt Jr., who drove the pace car and served as analyst in 2019. Earnhardt was instead covering the NASCAR Drydene Twin 500km that aired on NBCSN. Also absent was Robin Miller, who relinquished on-air duties due to battling bone cancer. Miller did contribute to the broadcasts, providing narration to pre-taped features during practice and time trials.

The Nielsen rating of 2.26 (3.699 million viewers) was an all-time low for the event.

Radio
The race was carried by the Indianapolis Motor Speedway Radio Network. The chief announcer or "Voice of the 500" for the fifth consecutive year was Mark Jaynes with Davey Hamilton as driver analyst.

References

External links

Official site

Indianapolis 500 races
Indianapolis 500
Indianapolis 500
Indianapolis 500
Indianapolis 500
21st century in Indianapolis
Indianapolis 500